Girls Football Academy, or simply GFA, is a women's football academy based in Beirut, Lebanon. They were founded in 2011 as the first exclusively female football academy in the Middle East.

GFA's senior team were runners up three times in a row in the Lebanese Women's Football League, between 2012 and 2014, as well as in the 2015–16 Lebanese Women's FA Cup. They withdrew their team in 2017, prior to the 2017–18 season.

History 
GFA was founded in November 2011 by former international footballer Nadia Assaf and her friend Walid Arakii, as the first private football academy for girls in the Middle East.

Honours 
Lebanese Women's FA Cup
Runners-up (1): 2015–16

See also 
 Lebanese Women's Football League
 Women's football in Lebanon
 List of women's association football clubs in Lebanon

References 

 
Defunct football clubs in Lebanon
Women's football clubs in Lebanon
Association football clubs established in 2011
Association football clubs disestablished in 2017
2011 establishments in Lebanon
2017 disestablishments in Lebanon